The Shire of Cloncurry is a local government area in North West Queensland, Australia. The major town and administrative centre of the shire is Cloncurry.

Prior to European settlement the area was home to the Mitakoodi, Kalkadoon and Pitta Pitta Aboriginal people.

The ghost town of Mary Kathleen, a town servicing a uranium mine since closed, is in the shire.

History
Wanamarra (also known as Maykulan and Wunumura is an Australian Aboriginal language in North West Queensland. The language region includes areas within the Shire of McKinlay, Shire of Cloncurry and Shire of Richmond, including the Flinders River area, and the towns of Kynuna and Richmond.

Yulluna (also known as Yalarnga, Yalarrnga, Jalanga, Jalannga, Wonganja, Gunggalida, and Jokula) is an Australian Aboriginal language of the Gulf Country. The Yulluna language region includes the  local government boundaries of the Shire of Cloncurry.
The first Europeans to visit the area were Wills and Burke in 1861, and the latter named the river Cloncurry after his cousin. In 1867, Ernest Henry wandered to this site in search of a grazing land and found copper. He is considered the founder of the town as well as its vast mineral deposits. In 1876, the town was named Cloncurry after the river. It is regarded as the place of innovations as Qantas began its operations here and the Royal Flying Doctor Service was established in Cloncurry in 1928.

The Doonmunya Division was created on 11 November 1879 as one of 74 divisions around Queensland under the Divisional Boards Act 1879 with a population of 396. However, the divisional board appeared to be completely inactive, perhaps because the division was so large (being the area surrounding the southern part of the Gulf of Carpentaria) and was very sparsely settled. Nonetheless some of the citizens were unhappy about this. Consequently, on 11 January 1883, the Doonmunya Division was abolished and a new Carpentaria Division was created to replace it.

Given the size of the Carpentaria Division, the distance to its headquarters in Normanton was an issue for residents in the Cloncurry area, leading to a desire to create their own local division. On 7 February 1884, part of Carpentaria Division was separated to create the new Cloncurry Division.

On 30 January 1885, adjustments were made to boundaries of the Cloncurry Division when the Burke Division was also split off from the Carpentaria Division.

On 31 March 1903, Cloncurry Division became the Shire of Cloncurry.

Libraries 
The Cloncurry Shire Council operates a public library in Cloncurry.

Towns and localities 
The Shire of Cloncurry includes the following settlements:

 Cloncurry
 Dajarra
 Dobbyn
 Duchess
 Four Ways
 Kajabbi
 Kuridala
 Malbon
 Mount Cuthbert
 Selwyn
 The Monument
 Three Rivers

Population

Chairmen and mayors
 1884: George Seymour
 1919: J. Hedleffe
 1927: Walter Angus Rose
 2008–2016 : Andrew Daniels
 2016: Gregory Vincent (Greg) Campbell

Other notable members of the council included:
 1924–1930 (deputy chairman 1927–1930) Tom Aikens, Member of the Queensland Legislative Assembly for Munndingburra and Townsville South

References

External links
 

 
Local government areas of Queensland
North West Queensland
1884 establishments in Australia